Shorea scaberrima is a tree in the family Dipterocarpaceae, native to Borneo. The specific epithet scaberrima means "very rough", referring to the indumentum.

Description
The multi-coloured bark starts smooth, later becoming cracked and flaky. The leathery to papery leaves are ovate to obovate. The inflorescences bear pink flowers.

Distribution and habitat
Shorea scaberrima is endemic to Borneo.

Conservation
Shorea scaberrima has been assessed as near threatened on the IUCN Red List. It is threatened by land conversion for plantations. It is also threatened by logging for its timber, including the construction of logging roads. Shorea scaberrima does occur in a number of protected areas, but only in Sarawak.

References

scaberrima
Endemic flora of Borneo
Plants described in 1886
Taxa named by William Burck